Ophioninae is a worldwide subfamily of Ichneumonidae with 32 genera, and very rich in tropical regions. They are koinobiont endoparasitoids of larval Lepidoptera, though at least one species parasitizes Scarabaeidae (Coleoptera). They are among the only Parasitica whose ovipositors can be used to sting vertebrates. The pupae are ovoid with a central clear band characteristic for this subfamily. Ophionines are typically fairly large, orange, slender insects with compressed, curved abdomens. They have very large ocelli and are active at night, and may be commonly encountered at lights.

References
Aubert, J.F. 1978. Les Ichneumonides ouest-palearctiques et leurs hotes 2. Banchinae et Suppl. aux Pimplinae. Laboratoire d'Evolution des Etres Organises, Paris & EDIFAT-OPIDA, Echauffour. 
Townes, H. & M. Townes. 1978. Ichneumon-flies of America North of Mexico: 7. Subfamily Banchinae, tribes Lissonotini and Banchini. Memoirs of the American Entomological Institute 26: 1-614.

External links

Waspweb
Diagnostic characters

Ichneumonidae